Gavin C. E. Stuart FRCPC is Professor in the Department of Obstetrics and Gynecology, UBC Faculty of Medicine,  where he formerly was Dean of Medicine (2003-2015)  and Vice-Provost Health (2009-2016).  

Stuart was born in Manitoba and attended medical school at the University of Western Ontario. He pursued postgraduate training in obstetrics and gynecology and then a fellowship in Gynecologic Oncology at Wayne State University School of Medicine. He has held faculty appointments at Wayne State University and the Tom Baker Cancer Centre, where later served as the centre's director and Head of the Department of Obstetrics and Gynecology. In 1999, he was appointed as Vice-President of the Alberta Cancer Board.

Stuart is a Fellow of the Royal College of Surgeons of Canada (elected 1980).  He also is a Fellow of the Canadian Academy of Health Sciences and former Chair of the Board of the Association of Faculties of Medicine of Canada.

References

External links
PubMed search for Gavin C.E. Stuart

Year of birth missing (living people)
Living people
Academic staff of the University of British Columbia
Scientists from Manitoba
University of Western Ontario alumni
Wayne State University faculty
Fellows of the Canadian Academy of Health Sciences
20th-century Canadian physicians
21st-century Canadian physicians
Canadian expatriate academics in the United States
Canadian university and college faculty deans

Canadian medical academics
Fellows of the Royal College of Physicians and Surgeons of Canada